The 2022 Big 12 Championship Game was a college football game played on December 3, 2022, at AT&T Stadium in Arlington, Texas. It was the 21st edition of the Big 12 Championship Game, and determined the champion of the Big 12 Conference for the 2022 season. The game began at 11:00 a.m. CST on ABC. The game featured the TCU Horned Frogs and the Kansas State Wildcats. Sponsored by soft drink company Keurig Dr Pepper through its flagship Dr Pepper brand, the game was officially known as the Dr Pepper Big 12 Championship Game.

Teams
The two teams met in the regular season on October 22, with TCU winning 38–28. This was the seventeenth meeting between the two teams, with the all time series tied at 8–8 heading into the game.

TCU 

The Horned Frogs clinched a spot in the game following their defeat of Texas on November 12. The Horned Frogs entered the championship game with a perfect 12–0 record and a conference record of 9–0. This was TCU's second appearance in the championship game, having lost 17–41 to Oklahoma in the 2017 game.

Kansas State

The Wildcats clinched a spot in the game following their victory against in-state rivals Kansas on November 26. The Wildcats entered the championship game with a record of 9–3 and a conference record of 7–2. Kansas State's losses were against Tulane, TCU, and Texas. This was Kansas State's fourth appearance in the championship game, appearing in the 1998, 2000, and 2003 games, losing in 1998 and 2000 and winning in 2003.

Game summary
Fighting for a spot in the College Football Playoff, TCU would score first with a 1-yard Touchdown reception by Taye Barber.

Kansas State would respond with 2 Touchdown drives to take a 14-7 in the middle of the 2nd quarter.  By the end of the 1st half, TCU trimmed the wildcats' lead to 4 with a 42-yard field goal.

Kansas State would take their first double digit lead with a RJ Garcia 25-yard TD reception, only for TCU to respond with a Touchdown for their own.  Afterwards, The frogs had a chance to reclaim the lead, they made it all the way to the 8-yard line, where Max Duggan's pass to Quentin Johnson was intercepted by Julius Brents in the end zone.

The interception would turn into a touchdown drive capped off by a 44-yard run by Deuce Vaughn, sending Kansas State's lead back to 11. TCU once again responded with another 42-yard goal, Kansas state would not score on their next drive, giving TCU one more chance.

At the 3:08 mark in the 4th quarter, TCU's apparent Touchdown reception by Jordan Hudson was called back due to an Offensive Pass Interference penalty. However Max Duggan would make it up for it by running for a 1st down on 2nd & 20 that same drive. With less than 2 minutes to go, TCU tied the game with a 8-yard QB Run, and a successful pass to Jared Wiley.  Kansas State got to midfield, but could not go further, so they punted and TCU ran out the clock to go to Overtime.

TCU won the coin toss and started on the right side of the field, on their 1st drive of OT, they made it to within 1 yard of scoring a TD on 3rd & goal, but Kendre Miller was stopped by the Kansas State defense. With 4th down at the one, TCU elected to go for it, giving the ball to Kendre Miller again, but was once again stopped by the Wildcats' defense and TCU turned it over on downs.

Afterwards, Ty Zentner clinched the Big 12 title for Kansas State with a 31-yard field goal.

Statistics
Team statistics
Individual statistics

See also
 List of Big 12 Conference football champions

References

Championship Game
Big 12 Championship Game
Kansas State Wildcats football games
TCU Horned Frogs football games
American football in the Dallas–Fort Worth metroplex
Big 12 Championship Game
Big 12 Championship Game